Francesco Baldini (born 14 March 1974) is an Italian football coach and a former player who played as a defender.

Club career
Throughout his club career, Baldini played for Italian clubs Massese, Juventus, Napoli, Roma, Genoa, Perugia, as well as San Marino.

International career
At international level, Baldini was called up to the Italian Under-21 Olympic squad for the 1993 Mediterranean Games, but did not make any appearances for the side.

Coaching career
In 2011, Baldini obtained a UEFA A License, making him eligible to coach Lega Pro teams.

He successively started a career as youth coach with Bologna, where he worked from 2011 to 2014. He then took his first head coaching role at the helm of Serie D amateurs Sestri Levante for the 2014–15 season, obtaining a second place in the league and later winning the national playoff tournament.

In June 2015, he was named new head coach of Lucchese, being however fired in October 2015 due to poor results; he was re-hired in February 2016 and then dismissed once again on 6 March.

After his Lucchese experience, Baldini returned to youth coaching, first in charge of the Under-17 team of Roma and then as Primavera Under-19 coach of Juventus.

On 11 July 2019, he was announced as the new head coach of Serie B club Trapani. He was dismissed by Trapani on 17 December 2019.

On 19 March 2021, he was announced as the new head coach of Serie C club Catania for the remainder of the season. He guided the Rossazzurri during a financially troubled season, which was cut short in April 2022 as Catania were excluded from the league after having been declared insolvent. Just a few days later, he was hired by relegation-battling Serie B club Vicenza as their new head coach with immediate effect.

Baldini failed to save Vicenza from relegation, after losing to Cosenza in the playoffs, but was confirmed in charge of the Biancorossi for the 2022–23 Serie C campaign. However, following a negative start to the club's season, he was eventually dismissed on 7 November 2022.

References

External links
 National teams statistics at FIGC
 Player profile

1974 births
Living people
Sportspeople from the Province of Massa-Carrara
Italian footballers
Footballers from Tuscany
S.S.D. Lucchese 1905 players
Juventus F.C. players
S.S.C. Napoli players
Reggina 1914 players
Genoa C.F.C. players
A.C. Perugia Calcio players
FC Lugano players
A.S.D. Victor San Marino players
Serie A players
Serie B players
Association football central defenders
Italian expatriate footballers
Italian expatriate sportspeople in Switzerland
Italian football managers
Trapani Calcio managers
Catania S.S.D. managers
L.R. Vicenza managers
Serie B managers
Serie C managers